Ramnath Dhakal (20 December 1962 – 5 April 2015) was a Nepalese politician, belonging to the Communist Party of Nepal (Unified Marxist-Leninist). In the 2008 Constituent Assembly election he was elected from the Rupandehi-5 constituency, winning 11,080 votes. On 5 April 2015, Dhakal died of swine flu and other diseases at the Grande International Hospital in Kathmandu.

References

External links
 Ramnath Dhakal Full Biography

2015 deaths
1962 births
Communist Party of Nepal (Unified Marxist–Leninist) politicians
Nepal MPs 1994–1999

Members of the 1st Nepalese Constituent Assembly